Alexis David Bbakka (born 13 September 1995) is a professional footballer who plays as a forward for Ettan Fotboll club Umeå and the Uganda national team. Born in Sweden, he plays for the Uganda national team.

International career 
Bbakka made his debut for Uganda in a 0–0 friendly draw against Turkmenistan on 9 June 2019. His first competitive match was 0–0 draw against Burkina Faso in Africa Cup of Nations qualification on 13 November 2019.

Personal life 
Born in Sweden but representing Uganda internationally, Bbakka has nationality for both countries.

References

External links 
 
 
 

1995 births
Living people
Ugandan footballers
Uganda international footballers
Swedish footballers
Swedish people of Ugandan descent
Association football forwards
Simba FC players
Växjö United FC players
Umeå FC players
Carlstad United BK players
Superettan players
Ettan Fotboll players